Eric Jelen and Michael Mortensen were the defending champions, but Jelen did not participate this year.  Mortensen partnered Gustavo Luza, losing in the first round.

Patrick Galbraith and Kelly Jones won the title, defeating Jim Grabb and David Pate 7–6, 6–4 in the final.

Seeds

  Pieter Aldrich /  Danie Visser (quarterfinals)
  Neil Broad /  Gary Muller (semifinals)
  Patrick Galbraith /  Kelly Jones (champions)
  Jim Grabb /  David Pate (final)

Draw

Draw

External links
Draw

Grand Prix de Tennis de Lyon